The Alabang Philippines Temple is a temple of the Church of Jesus Christ of Latter-day Saints (LDS Church) under construction in Alabang, Muntinlupa, Philippines.

History

In 1961, Gordon B. Hinckley and a small gathering of members at the Manila American Cemetery marked the beginning of the LDS Church in the Philippines. With more than 800,000 members in the country, the Philippines has the fourth largest membership in the world after the United States, Mexico and Brazil.

The Alabang Philippines Temple was announced by church president Thomas S. Monson in April 2017. This temple was announced concurrently with 4 other temples. At the time, the number of the church's total number of operating or announced temples was 182. 

A groundbreaking was originally scheduled for May 2, 2020, under the direction of D. Todd Christofferson. However, the groundbreaking was delayed as a result of the coronavirus pandemic. The groundbreaking occurred on June 4, 2020, with the area president, Evan A. Schmutz, presiding. The groundbreaking for this temple marked the first time in the church's history that two temples were under construction at the same time in the Philippines.

The temple will be a two-story building with a tall, tapering spire over the main entrance, and a patron housing facility behind the building.

The Alabang Philippines Temple will be the fourth LDS temple built in the Philippines, following the Manila (1984), Cebu City (2010), and Urdaneta (estimated for 2022) temples. Three more temples were announced in 2018 and 2019, which are the Davao (for which a groundbreaking was also held in 2020), and the Cagayan de Oro and Bacolod temples.  No information on groundbreakings have been communicated for the latter two temples. 

The Alabang and Manila temples are 13 miles apart.

See also

 The Church of Jesus Christ of Latter-day Saints in the Philippines
 Comparison of temples of The Church of Jesus Christ of Latter-day Saints
 List of temples of The Church of Jesus Christ of Latter-day Saints
 List of temples of The Church of Jesus Christ of Latter-day Saints by geographic region
 Religion in the Philippines
 Temple architecture (Latter-day Saints)

References

External links
Alabang Philippines Temple Groundbreaking announcement
Alabang Philippines Temple at ChurchofJesusChristTemples.org

Proposed buildings and structures in the Philippines
Proposed religious buildings and structures of the Church of Jesus Christ of Latter-day Saints
Temples (LDS Church) in the Philippines
The Church of Jesus Christ of Latter-day Saints in the Philippines
21st-century Latter Day Saint temples
Buildings and structures in Pangasinan
Churches in Metro Manila